Robert Elwyn James Watkins (born 29 October 1963 in Rochdale), is a British Liberal Democrat politician. He narrowly lost to Labour Party candidate Phil Woolas for the Oldham East and Saddleworth seat in the 2010 general election, but the result was overturned by an election court, which found that Woolas had knowingly lied about Watkins' personal character. Watkins had stood down as a councillor representing Healey Ward on Rochdale Council in order to contest the general election. He was selected as the Liberal Democrat candidate for the constituency in late 2007.

In 2008, during his time as a Rochdale councillor, Watkins said he was planning to seek legal advice after Phil Woolas' election agent suggested he had "abandoned his constituents and moved to the Middle East to work for a multi-billionaire sheikh".

Oldham East & Saddleworth court case

Watkins received significant media coverage in November 2010 after his petition against the return of Phil Woolas resulted in the general election result being declared void. Woolas was disqualified from holding elected office for three years. He failed to get the decision overturned and so a by-election for the Oldham East and Saddleworth seat was called which was won by Labour's Debbie Abrahams.

Before the judgement, Watkins had said he would quit politics if his petition against the general election result was unsuccessful.

References

External links

1963 births
Living people
Liberal Democrats (UK) parliamentary candidates
Alumni of the London School of Economics
People from Rochdale
Liberal Democrats (UK) councillors
Councillors in Greater Manchester